Veljko Jelenković (born 5 June 2003) is a Serbian-Bulgarian footballer who plays as a defender for Slavia Sofia.

Career
Born in Lovech, Bulgaria, Veljko is the son of former Litex Lovech player Nebojša Jelenković. He started his youth career in Kabel Novi Sad, before moving to Vojvodina. In 2021 he was sent on loan to the Bečej 1918 academy. In January 2023 he moved to Slavia Sofia. Veljko completed his professional debut in a league match against Pirin Blagoevgrad on 13 January 2023.

International career
Jelenkovic holds dual citizenship making him available for both Serbia and Bulgaria. In 2019 he was called up to Serbia U17 for the 2020 UEFA European Under-17 Championship qualification matches. In October 2022 it was reported that Bulgaria's manager, Mladen Krstajić wants Jelenkovic to join Bulgaria national team. On 18 March 2023, he received his first call-up for the Bulgaria U21 for the friendly tournament Antalya Cup between 25 and 28 March 2023.

Career statistics

Club

References

External links
 

2003 births
Living people
Bulgarian footballers
Serbian footballers
Bulgarian people of Serbian descent
FK Vojvodina players
RFK Novi Sad 1921 players
PFC Slavia Sofia players
First Professional Football League (Bulgaria) players
Association football midfielders